Ballymakeera or Ballymakeery (meaning "Townland of the Sons of Íre") is a small townland and Gaeltacht village in the civil parish of Ballyvourney, barony of Muskerry West, County Cork, Ireland. 

The village, which in turn has postal addresses of Ballymakeera East and Ballymakeera West, forms part of the twin villages of Ballymakeery and Ballyvourney. The village is situated in the valley of the River Sullane on the N22 national primary road. It is within the Muskerry Gaeltacht. Ballymakeera is part of the Cork North-West (Dáil constituency).

Three Ogham stones are nearby with the somewhat later addition of a Christian shrine to St Abán.

Notable people
The sean-nós singer Elizabeth Cronin lived in the village.

References

See also
 List of towns and villages in Ireland

Gaeltacht places in County Cork
Towns and villages in County Cork
Gaeltacht towns and villages